Group B of the 2017 CONCACAF Gold Cup consisted of hosts United States, Panama, Martinique, and Nicaragua. Matches began on July 8 and ended on July 15, 2017.

Teams

Standings

In the quarter-finals:
The winners of Group B, the United States, advanced to play the third-placed team of Group C, El Salvador.
The runners-up of Group B, Panama, advanced to play the winners of Group A, Costa Rica.

Matches

United States vs Panama

Martinique vs Nicaragua

Panama vs Nicaragua

United States vs Martinique

Panama vs Martinique

Nicaragua vs United States

References

External links
 

Group B